Domažlice railway station is a railway station in the municipality of Domažlice, located in the Plzeň Region of the Czech Republic.

References

Domažlice
Railway stations in Plzeň Region
Railway stations opened in 1861